Stuart Vaughan (born March 19, 1936) was an American football player.  He grew up in San Angelo, Texas, and played college football for the Utah Utes football team in 1956 and 1957.  In 1957, he caught 53 passes for 756 yards and five touchdowns in 10 games. He led the NCAA major colleges in 1957 in both total receptions and receiving yards. Paired with Utah quarterback Lee Grosscup, Vaughan broke Skyline Conference receiving records, and both were selected as first-team all-conference players. He was also selected by Coach and Athlete publication as the Mountain States player of the year for 1957. In August 2015, the Deseret News ranked Vaughan No. 62 on its list of the 100 greatest players in Utah football history.

See also
 List of college football yearly receiving leaders

References

1936 births
Living people
American football halfbacks
Utah Utes football players
Players of American football from Texas
People from San Angelo, Texas